In cosmology, Fermi balls are hypothetical objects that may have been created in the early history of the universe by spontaneous symmetry breaking. One paper has described them as "charged SLAC-bag type structures". Fermi balls can be modeled as a type of non-topological soliton.

The concept is named after Enrico Fermi (see Fermion).

Hypothesized explanations for observed phenomena

Dark matter 
A paper by theoretical physicists at Seoul National University has proposed that Fermi balls may be implicated in the formation of primordial black holes from a cosmic first-order phase transition, as a candidate explanation for dark matter.

References 

Physical cosmology
Hypothetical astronomical objects